In My Room is the debut album by Jacob Collier, released on 1 July 2016. The album is a collection of original pieces and covers, including a cover of "In My Room", a song by the Beach Boys. In February 2017, two of the songs on this album won Grammy Awards: Best Arrangement, Instrumental or A Cappella for the Stevie Wonder song "You and I" and Best Arrangement, Instrumental and Vocals for a cover of "Flintstones", the theme song from the 1960s television series The Flintstones. For this album, Jacob won the 2016 Jazz FM "Digital Initiative of the Year". It also was number one on the Billboard Contemporary Jazz Charts.

He began working on the album in late 2015, after performing with the WDR Big Band in a concert in Cologne, Germany. He arranged, recorded and produced the album entirely on his own, playing every instrument heard in the album. As part of the creation of the album, he created a new instrument called the "Harmoniser", a synthesiser which samples the voice of an artist in real time, so that the artist can sing harmonies live. Out of the eleven songs on the album, he wrote eight. The album was recorded and mixed in a three-month period in the music room of his family home in London, England, hence the title. The album cover is an image of the family music room, with several of the instruments used in the album. It was mastered by Bernie Grundman. Following the release, Collier embarked on a world tour with his one-man show, which included playing at the 2016 Montreux Jazz Festival.

Track listing 
All songs performed, arranged, recorded and produced entirely by Jacob Collier, in his room.

Personnel 
Adapted from album's liner notes.
 Jacob Collier – vocals, instruments, arrangements, engineering, and producing
 Ben Bloomberg – balance engineer
 Alfredo Pasquel – assistant engineer
 Bernie Grundman – mastering engineer

Charts

References 

2016 debut albums
Jacob Collier albums